The Men's 1500 metre freestyle event at the 2015 African Games took place on 10 September 2015 at Kintele Aquatic Complex.

Schedule
All times are Congo Standard Time (UTC+01:00)

Records 

Prior to the competition, the existing world and championship records were as follows.

The following new records were set during this competition.

Results

Final 
The final were held on 10 September.

References

Swimming at the 2015 African Games